Stena Danica is a ferry operated by Stena Line between Gothenburg and Fredrikshavn.

She entered service in 1983, along with her sister ship Stena Jutlandica. She still serves the same route today.

References

Ferries of Denmark
Ferries of Sweden
Danica
1980 ships